"Love Theme from St. Elmo's Fire" is the theme from the 1985 film St. Elmo's Fire by David Foster. It was performed in two versions: one as an instrumental by Foster (released as a single) and another with lyrics added and performed as a duet by Amy Holland and Donny Gerrard, subtitled "For Just a Moment".

Release
Released as a single in the United States, the instrumental version of the theme reached No. 15 on the Billboard Hot 100 and No. 3 on the Adult Contemporary chart. It eventually saw regular airplay on Smooth Jazz radio stations as well.

Personnel
David Foster - keyboards
David Boruff - saxophone

Chart performance

Weekly charts

Year-end charts

References

1985 singles
1985 songs
1980s instrumentals
Songs written by David Foster
Songs written for films
Atlantic Records singles
Song recordings produced by David Foster
Pop instrumentals